Sorbus khumbuensis is a species of rowan in the Sorbus microphylla aggregate with crimson fruits, turning white. It has small long-oval shaped leaves with 12-19 pairs of leaflets per leaf. It is native to Eastern Nepal, named after the Khumbu area. This plant is cultivated in parks and gardens as an ornamental plant.

External links
Picture and Info

khumbuensis